The Yale Bulldogs sailing team is a varsity intercollegiate athletic team of Yale University in New Haven, Connecticut, United States. The team is a member of the New England Intercollegiate Sailing Association, which is part of the Inter-Collegiate Sailing Association.

National championships 
Yale has won 26 national championships:
6 Dinghy National Championships (1947, 1949, 1950, 1975, 2014 and 2015)
5 Women’s Dinghy National Championships (2004, 2006, 2009, 2015 and 2017)
6 Team Racing National Championships  (2013, 2014, 2015, 2016, 2019, and 2022)
3 Men's Singlehanded National Championships (Thomas Barrows III in 2008, Cam Cullman in 2012 and Malcolm Lamphere in 2016) 
2 Women’s Singlehanded National Championships (Molly Carapiet in 2006 and Claire Dennis in 2011)
2 Match Racing National Championship (2021, 2022)
1 Women's Team Racing National Championship (2022)
1 Navy 44 class (Kennedy Cup) (1976)

And received the Leonard M. Fowle Trophy in 2009, 2013, 2014, 2016 and 2019.

Sailors

College Sailor of the Year awards 
Eight sailors from Yale have received men's and women's College Sailor of the Year awards:
Peter F. Isler in 1976
Stephen DeLancey Benjamin in 1978
Jane Macky in 2009
Thomas Barrows III in 2010
Graham Landy in 2014
Morgan Kiss in 2015
Ian Barrows in 2017
Nicholas Baird in 2019
Shawn Harvey in 2022

Additional notable Yale sailors 

 Nicole Breault (Yale class of 1994), four time winner of the U.S. Women's Open Championship

Fleet 
The fleet of the Yale University sailing team's dinghies include 20 Z420s, 20 Flying Juniors (FJs), and 4 Lasers.

Venue 
The home for the Yale Bulldogs sailing program is the Yale Corinthian Yacht Club.

References

External links
Website

Inter-Collegiate Sailing Association teams
Sports clubs established in 1881
Yale Bulldogs sailing